Alternanthera helleri is a species of plant in the family Amaranthaceae. It is endemic to Ecuador.  It is believed to be green in color anywhere from 90 to 100% of the year depending on altitude.  The leaves are considered to be highly toxic to humans and should not be consumed under any circumstances.

Alternanthera helleri is a fall-blooming species, it can be planted at any time of year, but the best time is early/middle fall, as this provides it with an optimum blooming window when it will be in season. It is very rare to find growing in the wild, and recent national park's and forest's efforts to remove hazardous plants such as this one have drastically reduced the numbers in the wild. It is still grown, however, in laboratory settings, where scientists try to analyze just exactly what makes it so toxic to humans. It is theorized that the plant produces a powerful hemotoxin, perhaps similar to oleander in nature.

References

helleri
Endemic flora of Ecuador
Garden plants of South America
Vulnerable plants
Taxonomy articles created by Polbot